Benjamin Matthew Hirst (born 21 October 1997) is an English former professional footballer who played as a striker.

Hirst started his career in York City's youth system, making his first-team debut in 2014. He had a loan spell with Northern Premier League Division One North club Scarborough Athletic in 2015, before being released by York in 2016. Hirst had a short with Pickering Town in the Northern Counties East League Premier Division, before retiring from football to pursue his carpet and oven cleaning business.

Career
Born in York, North Yorkshire, Hirst played for York & District Schoolboys and was named their Most Valuable Player at an end of season awards ceremony in June 2013. He later joined York City's youth system and became a first-year scholar in the summer of 2014. He made his first-team debut aged 16 as a 73rd-minute substitute for Ryan Jarvis in a 1–1 away draw with Tranmere Rovers in the opening match of the 2014–15 season on 9 August 2014. Having made five first-team appearances, he signed a professional contract with York in November 2014, tying him to the club until the summer of 2016.

Hirst joined Northern Premier League Division One North club Scarborough Athletic on a one-month loan on 29 September 2015, with his chances at York limited. He made his debut that day, as a substitute in a 4–2 away defeat to Clitheroe. He returned to York in November 2015, having made four appearances for Scarborough. Hirst was released by York when his contract expired at the end of 2015–16.

After a successful trial, Hirst joined Northern Counties East League Premier Division club Pickering Town in the summer of 2016. In August 2016, he retired from football after deciding to focus on his carpet cleaning business.

Career statistics

References

External links

1997 births
Living people
Footballers from York
English footballers
Association football forwards
York City F.C. players
Scarborough Athletic F.C. players
Pickering Town F.C. players
English Football League players
Northern Premier League players